Queen Desira is a fictional character who appeared in many Golden Age adventures with Wonder Woman. She is the queen of the planet Venus, and would often seek help from Wonder Woman to defend her planet. Desira empowered Wonder Woman with magnetic hearing, which allowed the queen to transmit messages through Wonder Woman's earrings.

Fictional character biography
Nazis led by scientist Hans Goobsten capture the Justice Society during their monthly meeting by pumping gas into their headquarters, after Hitler decides they must be eliminated. Using a group of newly invented rockets, the Nazis catapult the JSA into space. Hawkman lands on Saturn, Sandman on Uranus, Doctor Mid-Nite on Neptune, Starman on Jupiter, Atom on Mars, Spectre on Pluto, Johnny Thunder on Mercury, and Wonder Woman on Venus. Each member helps the natives on that world and then returns to Earth with technology to aid the war effort. On Earth, the reunited JSA defeats the Nazis who captured them. While on Venus and being watched by the goddess Aphrodite, who directs her rocket towards Venus, Wonder Woman first meets Desira, the Queen of Venus. Together they battle Solaris and his Meteor Men, who are killing the men of the planet, and Wonder Woman, after capturing the men, receives the gift of magnetic hearing, which enables her to read the Queen's mind.(All-Star Comics #13, All-Star Squadron #57)

Later, Wonder Woman is summoned by Queen Desira of Venus to help aid the planet Eros. On Eros, women are sentenced to prison, but one renegade woman, Rebla, has been paroled and started a war. Wonder Woman, joined by Steve Trevor and Etta Candy help to fight the war. They convince Rebla to surrender, but she has left Dominus in charge. He continues fighting until Wonder Woman is able to stop him. (Sensation Comics #11)

In her next appearance, Wonder Woman uses her earrings with the power of magnetic hearing to contact Queen Desira of Venus. She learns that a group of munitions manufacturers are plotting to start a third world war. Diana Prince is taken prisoner by one of their agents who is posing as Steve's secretary. Diana manages to get free and stop the conspirators as Wonder Woman. Wonder Woman turns the plotters over to Desira for re She sends them to Venus using a teleporter in Paula's lab.

Later, two Holliday Girl pledges accidentally activate the teleporter. One of the girls is sent to Venus, then releases a conspirator named Velma. Wonder Woman goes back to Venus to stop an uprising led by Velma. She then brings the female villain back to Earth.

Velma escapes again, this time with the help of her boyfriend Killer Dogan. Velma and Dogan raid Paula's lab and send their gang to Venus to conquer. Wonder Woman and Paula are taken prisoner too. Queen Desira is forced to surrender, but Velma unleashes a bomb anyway. Wonder Woman frees herself and with the help of Paula, Queen Desira, and the other Venusians, Velma is stopped. The conspirators are then placed in Aphrodite girdles which force them to be submissive. The girdles are welded on until such time as the crooks prove that they have fully reformed. (Wonder Woman #12)

In the final appearance of Desira, after helping teach a group of young girls on Paradise Island, Wonder Woman is enlisted by Aphrodite to help the women of Eveland. The women live in a hidden land near the South Pole and are led by Eve, the daughter of Queen Desira of Venus. Eve's daughter Lectress has been kidnapped by the evil Seal Men. Wonder Woman vows to rescue Eve and several other captives.

Wonder Woman invades Bitterland, the home of the Seal Men and rescues the women. Lectress then stows away in Wonder Woman's plane and returns to America. There she joins the Holliday Girls. However, Eve contacts Wonder Woman when her daughter is found missing.

Wonder Woman returns to Eveland and rescues Eve from Bitterland. However, Lectress still does not reveal herself and return to her mother. The Seal Men then threaten to flood Eveland, so Wonder Woman is forced to surrender. She uses her own captivity to infiltrate Bitterland and rescue other captives. Finally the Seal Men make peace with Eveland, and Lectress returns home. (Wonder Woman #13)

References

DC Comics aliens
Fictional queens
Fictional Venusians
DC Comics female superheroes
Wonder Woman characters
DC Comics extraterrestrial superheroes
Characters created by William Moulton Marston
Characters created by Gardner Fox